The Vasai Road–Diva DEMU is a DEMU train belonging to Central Railway zone that runs between  and  in India. It is currently being operated with 71083/71084/71085/71086/71093/71094 train numbers on a daily basis.

Service 

The Vasai Road–Diva DEMU has an average speed of 46 km/hr and covers 40 km in 52m.
The Diva–Vasai Road DEMU has an average speed of 40 km/hr and covers 40 km in 1h.

Route and halts

The important halts of the train are:

See also 

 Vasai Road railway station
 Diva Junction railway station

Notes

References

External links 

 71093/Vasai Road–Diva DEMU
 71094/Diva-Vasai Road DEMU
 71083/Vasai Road-Diva DEMU
 71084/Diva-Vasai Road DEMU
 71085/Vasai Road-Diva DEMU
 71086/Diva-Vasai Road DEMU

Rail transport in Maharashtra
Diesel–electric multiple units of India
Transport in Thane
Transport in Vasai-Virar
Railway services introduced in 2011
2011 establishments in Maharashtra